The Texas Wheelers is an American sitcom that aired in 1974 and 1975. The series, produced by MTM Enterprises, is about the cantankerous but lovable Zack Wheeler, a long-lost father who returned to raise his children Truckie, Doobie, Boo, and T.J. in rural Texas after their mother died.

The show was not successful, due to being broadcast against the second half of NBC's Top 20 hit The Rockford Files, and was canceled after four episodes in the fall of 1974. An additional four episodes were aired in June and July 1975.  The show is notable as one of MTM's few flops, and for the well-known actors in its cast, including Jack Elam as Zack, Gary Busey as Truckie, Mark Hamill as Doobie, Tony Becker as T.J., and Lisa Eilbacher as the Wheelers' friend Sally.

The theme song for the show was "Illegal Smile" by John Prine.

Cast

Jack Elam as Zack Wheeler
Gary Busey as Truckie Wheeler
Karen Obediear as Boo Wheeler
Mark Hamill as Doobie Wheeler
Tony Becker as T.J. Wheeler

Episodes

References
Tim Brooks & Earle Marsh, The Complete Directory to Prime Time Network and Cable TV Shows (7th ed. 1999), p. 1013.

External links 

 

American Broadcasting Company original programming
1970s American sitcoms
1974 American television series debuts
1975 American television series endings
Television shows set in Texas
Television series by MTM Enterprises